Star One, Star 1, and variants may refer to:

 Star One (band), a Dutch music group
 Star One (satellite operator), a Brazilian satellite company
 Star One (Indian TV channel), a former Hindi-language TV channel
 "Star One", an episode of Blake's 7

See also
 "STARI" (Southern tick-associated rash illness)
 One star (disambiguation)
 Istar (disambiguation)